Sundanese is a Unicode block containing modern characters for writing the Sundanese script of the Sundanese language of the island of Java, Indonesia.

History
The following Unicode-related documents record the purpose and process of defining specific characters in the Sundanese block:

See also 
 Javanese (Unicode block)
 Balinese (Unicode block)

References 

Unicode blocks
Sundanese script